The 1999 Coca-Cola 600, the 40th running of the event, was a NASCAR Winston Cup Series race held on May 30, 1999 at Lowe's Motor Speedway in Concord, North Carolina. Contested at 400 laps on the 1.5 mile (2.4 km) speedway, it was the twelfth race of the 1999 NASCAR Winston Cup Series season.

The race was won by Jeff Burton, driving the #99 Exide Batteries Ford Taurus for Roush Racing. It was his third victory of six he recorded during the 1999 season and his first of two wins in the Coca-Cola 600 (he later won the event in 2001). He also won a $1 million bonus from Winston as part of their No Bull 5 competition.

There were two other noteworthy stories from the race, both involving rookie drivers. After winning several races in the Busch Series for his father’s team, Dale Earnhardt Jr. made his Winston Cup debut in the #8 Budweiser Chevrolet Monte Carlo. He finished the race in sixteenth place. Another rookie, Tony Stewart, participated in both the Indianapolis 500 and the Coca-Cola 600 in the same day. At Indianapolis, he ran ninth driving the #22 car for Tri-Star Motorsports. After the race he flew to Charlotte and started the #20 Home Depot Pontiac Grand Prix for Joe Gibbs Racing, bringing it home in fourth place. He was the third driver after John Andretti in 1994 and Robby Gordon in 1997 to do so; he repeated this feat in 2001 and ran the entire distance of both events.

Background

Lowe's Motor Speedway is a motorsports complex located in Concord, North Carolina, United States 13 miles from Charlotte, North Carolina. The complex features a 1.5 miles (2.4 km) quad oval track that hosts NASCAR racing including the prestigious Coca-Cola 600 on Memorial Day weekend and The Winston, as well as the UAW-GM Quality 500. The speedway was built in 1959 by Bruton Smith and is considered the home track for NASCAR with many race teams located in the Charlotte area. The track is owned and operated by Speedway Motorsports Inc. (SMI) with Marcus G. Smith (son of Bruton Smith) as track president.

Top 10 results

Race statistics
 Time of race: 3:57:50
 Average Speed: 
 Pole Speed: 185.23
 Cautions: 5 for 23 laps
 Margin of Victory: 0.574 sec
 Lead changes: 23
 Percent of race run under caution: 5.8%         
 Average green flag run: 62.8 laps

References

Coca-Cola 600
Coca-Cola 600
NASCAR races at Charlotte Motor Speedway